Ricardo Ignacio Montero Allende (born 12 June 1983) is a Chilean lawyer who was elected as a member of the Chilean Constitutional Convention.

References

External links
 BCN Profile

Living people
1983 births
Pontifical Catholic University of Chile alumni
Autonomous University of Barcelona alumni
21st-century Chilean politicians
Members of the Chilean Constitutional Convention
Socialist Party of Chile politicians